The Philco Predicta is a black and white television chassis style, which was made in several cabinet models with 17” or 21” screens by the American company Philco from 1958 to 1960. The Predicta was marketed as the world’s first swivel-screen television. Designed by Catherine Winkler, Severin Jonnaffen and Richard Whipple, it featured a picture tube (CRT) that separated from the rest of the cabinet.

The safety mask on the front of the picture tube was made with a new organic plastic product by Eastman Plastics called “tenite”, which protected the glass and provided implosion protection for the user and produced a greenish tint. The Predicta also had a thinner picture tube than many other televisions at the time, which led it to be marketed as the more futuristic television set. 

Predicta television sets were constructed with a variety of cabinet configurations, some detachable but all separate from the tube itself and connected by wires. 

The Predicta Tandem model had a fully detached picture tube and an umbilical cable, which allowed the controls and speaker for the set to be next to the viewer, with the screen up to 25 feet away. Also unique to this version was a large handle over the top to carry the cathode ray tube portion wherever the viewer wanted it. This version also required more internal circuitry to drive the video signal through the cable. 

Philco also made Directa, a short-lived remote series in 1959 before the firm was bought by the Ford Motor Company in 1961. This set feature provided Philco with an answer to Zenith's wireless remote control, “Space Command”, which had been introduced the same year. The Predicta was announced to the industry in 1958, and launched to the public the following year at the 1959 Miss America pageant, which was sponsored by Philco.

Shortly after the Predicta was announced, its reliability was called into question by several trade and consumer publications. As Philco was phasing in its next chassis iteration, the Cool Chassis, the company went bankrupt, with its development of the Predicta being a possible factor. The company was acquired shortly afterwards by Ford. 

The Pixar animated film Toy Story 2 featured a miniature replica of the Predicta, which was based on one owned by the film's director, John Lasseter.

References

Consumer electronics
Television technology
Products introduced in 1958
Products and services discontinued in 1960